Buttermilk Falls also known as Adriucha or Adriutha is a waterfall located on Yatesville Creek northeast of Currytown, New York.

References

Waterfalls of New York (state)
Landforms of Montgomery County, New York
Tourist attractions in Montgomery County, New York